Giuseppe Cruciani (born 15 September 1966) is an Italian radio personality, shock jock, television presenter and journalist. He is known in Italy for his provocative and irreverent manner.

La Zanzara 
Alongside David Parenzo, Cruciani is the host of hot talk radio show La Zanzara (Italian for The Mosquito) aired on Radio 24. On La Zanzara, current affairs are discussed with guests including politicians, pundits and listeners calling from home. Over time, the show has dealt with subjects such as satire, politics and sex, with Cruciani often taking controversial positions. Listeners can leave their number and be called back by the hosts. Calls often turn into heated dispute. Traditionally, rock and heavy metal music is played in the background.
Many of the listeners calling from home ended up dead or in jail, such as Mauro da Mantova, Giovanni da Reggio Calabria, Donato da Varese or Doctor Petrella

Television 
 Complotti (La7, 2009)
 Apocalypse (Rete 4, 2009/2012)
 Controcampo (Rete 4, 2010–2011)
 Controcampo Linea Notte (Italia 1, 2011–2012)
 La zanzara in tv (TGcom24, 2012)
 Radio Belva (Rete 4, 2013)
 Tango (Sky, 2014), with Ilaria d'Amico
 Tiki Taka - Il calcio è il nostro gioco (Italia 1, 2014–2015)
 RDS Academy (Sky Uno, 2015)

References

External links 

1966 births
Living people
Mass media people from Rome
Italian television journalists
Italian radio presenters
Italian television presenters
Italian atheists